Government College, Daman, is a general degree college situated in Daman. It was established in the year 1966. The college is affiliated with Veer Narmad South Gujarat University.

Accreditation
The college is  recognized by the University Grants Commission (UGC).

References

External links

Universities and colleges in Dadra and Nagar Haveli and Daman and Diu
Educational institutions established in 1966
1966 establishments in Daman and Diu
Daman, India